Anuradha  is a 1940 Bollywood film directed by Mohan Sinha. It stars Trilok Kapoor, Jeevan, Maya Bannerji, Vatsala Kumtekar, Anant Marathe and Agha. The film was produced by Circo Productions and had Badri Prasad as its music director.

Cast
 Trilok Kapoor
 Maya Bannerji
 Jeevan
 Vatsala Kumtekar
 Anant Marathe
 Agha

References

External links
 

1940 films
1940s Hindi-language films
Indian black-and-white films